Charles Cleveland Merz (July 6, 1888 in Indianapolis, Indiana – July 8, 1952 in Indianapolis, Indiana) was an American racecar driver, military officer, engineering entrepreneur, and racing official. Active in the early years of the Indianapolis 500, he later became Chief Steward of the Memorial Day Classic.

Early years
At just 17, Charlie Merz demonstrated impressive skill as a race driver when he was hired by Arthur C. Newby (one of the future founders of the Indianapolis Motor Speedway) to drive one of his National Motor Vehicle Company stock cars against some of the top competitors in the United States at a  race at the Indiana State Fairgrounds one-mile (1.6 km) dirt oval on November 4, 1905. Merz led the race over his teammate W.F. "Jap" Clemmens until lap 80 when his right rear tire blew and sent him crashing through a wooden fence.

After observing the event, Carl G. Fisher, who later founded the Indianapolis Motor Speedway, saw the opportunity to promote American automobiles by staging a 24-hour distance record run. Working with Newby and James A. Allison, his partner at Prest-O-Lite, the trio organized the record run again at the Indiana State Fairgrounds for November 17–18. Two Nationals, again driven by Merz and Clemens, began the run, this time with Clemens setting the early pace. Clemens' car blew a tire on mile 152, crashing through the wooden fence. As with Merz on November 4, he was unscathed. As night fell, Prest-O-Lite lamps provided by Allison and Fisher illuminated the track. 

The men struggled through the night, rarely driving longer than 30 minute stints. The cold, exacerbated by their exposure in open cockpit cars, was debilitating. Goggles were useless because they frosted over within minutes. Stiff with cold and bloodshot eyes, both Clemens and Merz warmed themselves with a bonfire and hot coffee when they stopped.

Young Merz loved motorized competition. In addition to competing in automobile races, he also rode motorcycles and was entered in the Indianapolis Motor Speedway's first motorcycle meet in 1909.

Vanderbilt Cup
Charlie Merz competed in one William Kissam Vanderbilt, Jr. Cup Race (William Kissam Vanderbilt II), the first major race in the United States on October 30, 1909. Again, the 21-year-old was at the wheel of a National stock car. He ran well in the early going, working his way into third by the halfway point. A bent crankshaft ended his day on lap 12 of the 22 lap race. He ended the Vanderbilt Cup in seventh position.

Indianapolis Motor Speedway
Charlie Merz not only raced in the Indianapolis 500 four times, but also competed in the races held at the Indianapolis Motor Speedway prior to the first running of the Indianapolis 500 in 1911.

Pre-Indy 500 races at the Speedway
Charlie Merz did pick up one victory at the Indianapolis Motor Speedway, the track's seventh auto race in August 1909. The race was a four lap (10 miles) affair for stock chassis with engines of 301 to 450 cubic inch displacement. Only four cars started the race, with Jap Clemens retiring almost immediately. Merz, driving another National, won over Louis Chevrolet in a Buick. His victory was met with applause from local fans as both driver and car were from Indianapolis. He finished second and third in two other handicap events as well.

More significant, perhaps, were two other races Merz competed in at the same 1909 race meet. Both ended in tragedy. They were the longest races of the 1909 race meet, the  Prest-O-Lite Trophy and the  Wheeler-Schebler Trophy.

The Prest-O-Lite race yielded a good result for Merz with a third-place finish behind winner Bob Burman in a Buick. Unfortunately, the race also produced the first fatalities at the Indianapolis Motor Speedway when 26-year-old driver Wilfred Bourque and his 22-year-old riding mechanic Harry Holcomb struck a fence post. The incident destroyed his Knox Automobile and killed both men.

Merz was lucky to escape injury as his riding mechanic, Claude Kellum was killed. Two spectators perished in the incident and several more sustained minor injuries.

Following these tragedies, the Indianapolis Motor Speedway, initially using a crushed stone surface, was paved with brick to produce a safer track. The first full race meet for the new "Brickyard," came in May 1910. Merz competed in seven events in that race meet. The most noteworthy was his second place drive for National in the  Prest-O-Lite Trophy.

At the Speedway's July 1910 meet, Merz drove for Empire, a short-lived Indianapolis automobile company founded by Carl G. Fisher. He drove in two minor sprint races, with a best finish of second. In August 1910 Merz was back with National and ran in nine races. In the Remy Grand Brassard race, Merz battled teammate and future Indy 500 winner, Howdy Wilcox, to the finish only to lose by nine seconds. Wilcox won and Merz was second.

Indy 500 highlights
Charlie Merz had a strong record in the Indianapolis 500, finishing in the top 10 in three of his four starts. He finished seventh in the first "500" in 1911, again driving for National. In 1912 he changed to the Stutz team, impressing observers with his ability to keep a car with the second smallest engine (390 cubic inches) in contention. The Horseless Age praised his driving skill through the Speedway's banked turns, noting that it was in the turns that he picked up time on his competitors. Merz finished a very respectable fourth.

Merz's best finish was third in 1913. It also proved to be his most spectacular. Merz, driving a Stutz again, was chasing Spencer Wishart in a New Jersey-built Mercer for second place when his engine burst into flames just before starting the last of the race's 200 laps. Instead of stopping, Merz pushed on, gambling he could finish one more lap. Coming down the front stretch to the checkered flag, spectators saw Merz's mechanic, Harry Martin, leaning out of the cockpit trying to bat the flames down with a jacket. The team earned their third-place finish that day.

Merz did not race at Indy in 1914 or 1915, but returned in 1916 for his final attempt to win the "500." A loss of oil pressure in his Peugeot engine ended his day early, leaving him in 19th place.

Later career
Merz took up the position of engineer for Rayfield Carburetter Company in 1914 and served in France in the American Expeditionary Forces, the forerunner of the US Army Air Corps, from 1917 to 1919 reaching the rank of lieutenant-colonel. He joined Harry C. Stutz when Stutz set up his new business, H. C. S. Motor Car Company, in mid-1919. There, he held the position of assistant to the president until 1925, when he was appointed receiver for the company until it was liquidated in 1927.

In 1927, at age 39, Merz founded Merz Engineering and served as its president until his retirement in 1946. The company, under the leadership of Miklos Sperling, sponsored an Indy 500 team from 1950 to 1955. Merz served as Chief Steward for the Indianapolis 500, the top official of the race, from 1935 to 1939.

Death
Merz died in his home just outside Indianapolis at age 64 on July 8, 1952. He is buried at Crown Hill Cemetery in Indianapolis.

Indy 500 results

References

 Official History of the Indianapolis 500, Donald Davidson and Rick Schaffer, Crash Media Group, 2006, page 24.
 National company brochure, 1917, page 6
 500 Miles to Go, Al Bloemker, Coward-McGann, Inc. New York, 1966, page 30.
 Horseless Age, "National Stock Car Breaks World's Record," November 17, 1905.
 Indianapolis Star, "Clemens Sets New 150-Mile Record," November 17, 1905.
 Motor Age, "New Marks Are Made," November 23, 1905.
 The Automobile, "Twenty-four-hour Record Broken at Indianapolis," November 23, 1905.
 Indy: Racing Before The 500, The Untold Story of the Brickyard, D. Bruce Scott, Indiana Reflections, LLC, 2005, page 213.
 Kokomo Tribune, "Oldtime Race Driver Dies at New Augusta," July 9, 1952, page 12.
 Logansport Paros-Tribune, "C.C. Merz, Former Race Driver, Dies," July 9, 1952, page 18.
 Horseless Age, "Dawson in National Wins Thrilling 500-Mile Indianapolis Race," June 5, 1912, page 980.
 First Super Speedway

Indianapolis 500 drivers
1888 births
1952 deaths
Burials at Crown Hill Cemetery
Racing drivers from Indianapolis